Robert Pennington may refer to:
 Robert Pennington, 17th century British aristocrat affiliated with Charles II of England; owner of Southside House
 Robert B. Pennington, US Marine charged in 2006 with crimes relating to the abduction and murder of an Iraqi civilian